EMI America Records was started in 1978 by EMI as a second US label next to Capitol Records. It absorbed Liberty Records in 1984. In the late 1980s, EMI America was consolidated with Manhattan Records to form EMI Manhattan Records, which later became known as EMI USA and then simply as EMI in 1990, then part of EMI Records Group North America (ERG) in 1992, when the then-Thorn EMI acquired Virgin Records America. Since 2013, this organization of labels has been under Universal Music's Capitol Music Group while the reissues of recordings have been distributed by former sister label Capitol Records.

Artists
Past artists have included: Marty Balin, Blessid Union of Souls, David Bowie, Kate Bush, Stray Cats, Lenny Burns, Kim Carnes, Sheena Easton, Joe "Bean" Esposito,  Robin Gibb, Go West, Corey Hart (outside Canada), Murray Head, Kajagoogoo,  Limahl, J. Geils, Michael Stanley Band, Naked Eyes, Queensrÿche, Barbara Mandrell, Pet Shop Boys , Red Hot Chili Peppers, Cliff Richard, Roxette, Steve Harley & Cockney Rebel, Talk Talk, George Thorogood and the Destroyers, John Waite, and Kim Wilde (US and Canada for most UK and other European artists). Today, the catalog is mainly managed by Capitol Music Group and Universal Music Group.

See also
 List of record labels

References

External links
EMI America Records at discogs.com

Defunct record labels of the United States
EMI
Record labels established in 1978
1978 establishments in California
1980s disestablishments in California